The 2018 Roseanne 300 was the 5th stock car race of the 2018 NASCAR Xfinity Series season, and the 20th iteration of the event. The race was held on Saturday, March 17, 2018, in Fontana, California, at Auto Club Speedway, a  permanent D-shaped oval racetrack. The race took the scheduled 150 laps to complete. At race's end, Joey Logano of Team Penske would dominate and win his 29th NASCAR Xfinity Series win of his career and the first of his part-time season. To fill out the podium, Justin Allgaier and Elliott Sadler, both driving for JR Motorsports would finish second and third, respectively.

Background 

Auto Club Speedway (formerly California Speedway) is a 2 miles (3.2 km), low-banked, D-shaped oval superspeedway in Fontana, California which has hosted NASCAR racing annually since 1997. It is also used for open wheel racing events. The racetrack is located near the former locations of Ontario Motor Speedway and Riverside International Raceway. The track is owned and operated by International Speedway Corporation and is the only track owned by ISC to have naming rights sold. The speedway is served by the nearby Interstate 10 and Interstate 15 freeways as well as a Metrolink station located behind the backstretch.

Entry list

Practice

First practice 
First practice was held on Friday, March 16 at 12:35 PM PST.

Second and final practice 
The second and final practice was held on Friday, 2:35 PM PST.

Qualifying 
Qualifying would take place on Saturday, March 17 at 10:35 AM PST. Since Auto Club Speedway is at least 2 miles (3.2 km), the qualifying system was a single car, single lap, two round system where in the first round, everyone would set a time to determine positions 13-40. Then, the fastest 12 qualifiers would move on to the second round to determine positions 1-12.

No drivers would fail to qualify.

Full qualifying results

Race results 
Stage 1 Laps: 35

Stage 2 Laps: 35

Stage 3 Laps: 80

References 

2018 NASCAR Xfinity Series
NASCAR races at Auto Club Speedway
March 2018 sports events in the United States
2018 in sports in California